Proterodesma chathamica is a species of moth in the family Tineidae. It was described by John S. Dugdale in 1971. This species is endemic to New Zealand.

References

Moths described in 1971
Tineidae
Moths of New Zealand
Endemic fauna of New Zealand
Endemic moths of New Zealand